Musazai sharif is a town and union council of Dera Ismail Khan District in Khyber Pakhtunkhwa province of Pakistan. It is located at 31°40'56N 70°21'47E and has an altitude of 216 metres (711 feet).

Musazai Sharif is about 65 km (40 miles) southwest of Dera Ismail Khan and Village Council is located 7 km south of Drabin Tehsil. The village is famous for the Naqshbandiyya Ahmadiyya Saeediya Monastery, which was founded by Khawaja Dost Muhammad Kandahari (may Allah have mercy on him).Hazrat Pir khawaja usman Damani. Hazrat Pir Khawaja Sirajudin Damani Naqshbindi. The ancient population of the village consisted of Mainkhai Tajokhel, Durani Achakzai (Pir Hazrat khwajgan Sahibzada) Machhankhel (Sheikh) and Faqir Sheikh, while the village gained its fame from the monastery.

The main source of livelihood for the villagers is farming, government services and labor.

References 

Union councils of Dera Ismail Khan District
Populated places in Dera Ismail Khan District